The  is a railway museum owned by Central Japan Railway Company (JR Central) in Nagoya, Japan. The museum opened on 14 March 2011.

The museum features 39 full-size railway vehicles and one bus exhibit, train cab simulators, and railway model dioramas.

Exhibits
The following full-size vehicles are on display.

Shinkansen

 MLX01 SCMaglev car No. MLX01-1 (built 1995 by Mitsubishi Heavy Industries, from JR Research)
 0 Series Shinkansen car – No. 21-86 (built 1971 by Kisha Seizo, from Hamamatsu Works)
 0 Series Shinkansen car – No. 16-2034 (built 1986 by Nippon Sharyo, from Hamamatsu Works)
 0 Series Shinkansen car – No. 36-84 (built 1975 by Hitachi, from Hamamatsu Works)
 0 Series Shinkansen car – No. 37-2523 (built 1983 by Hitachi, from Hamamatsu Works)
 Class 922 Doctor Yellow car No. 922-26 (built 1979 by Hitachi, from JR West)
 100 Series Shinkansen car – No. 123-1 (built 1986 by Hitachi, from Hamamatsu Works)
 100 Series Shinkansen car – No. 168-9001 (built 1985 by Kinki Sharyo, from Hamamatsu Works)
 300 Series Shinkansen prototype car – No. 322-9001 (built 1990 by Hitachi, from Hamamatsu Works)
 Class 955 "300X" car  No. 955-6 (built 1994 by Hitachi, from Hamamatsu Works)
 700 Series Shinkansen prototype car – No. 723-9001 (ex-set C1, built 1997 by Kawasaki Heavy Industries, on display from 2 January 2014)
 N700 Series Shinkansen prototype car – No. 783-9001 (ex-set X0, built 2005 by Hitachi, on display from 17 July 2019)(displayed outside)
 N700 Series Shinkansen prototype car – No. 775-9001 (ex-set X0, built 2005 by Nippon Sharyo, on display from 17 July 2019, displayed outside)
 N700 Series Shinkansen prototype car – No. 786-9201 (ex-set X0, built 2005 by Nippon Sharyo, on display from 17 July 2019, displayed outside)

Locomotives

 Class Ke 90 steam locomotive - No. Ke 90 (built 1918, from Nagoya Training Centre) (displayed outside)
 JNR Class C57 steam locomotive - No. C57 139 (built 1940 by Mitsubishi Heavy Industries, from Nagoya Training Centre)
 JNR Class C62 steam locomotive - No. C62 17 (built 1948 by Hitachi, from Higashiyama Park)
 JNR Class ED11 electric locomotive - No. ED11 2 (built 1922 by General Electric, from Sakuma Rail Park)
 JNR Class ED18 electric locomotive - No. ED18 2 (built 1923 by English Electric, from Hamamatsu Works)
 JNR Class EF58 electric locomotive - No. EF58 157 (built 1957 by Mitsubishi Electric, from Hamamatsu Works)

Electric railcars

 Class MoHa 1 3rd-class electric railcar - No. MoHa 1035 (built 1922 by Kisha Seizo, from Ina-Matsushima Depot)
 KuMoHa 12 electric railcar - No. KuMoHa 12041 (built 1927 by Kisha Seizo, from Ina-Matsushima Depot)
 Class KuMoHa 52 EMU car - No. MoHa 52004 (built 1937 by Kawasaki Sharyo, from Sakuma Rail Park)
 Class MoHa 63 EMU car - No. MoHa 63638 (built 1947 by Kawasaki Sharyo, from Hamamatsu Works)
 111 series EMU car - No. KuHa 111-1 (built 1962 by Nippon Sharyo, from Sakuma Rail Park)
 117 series EMU car - KuHa 117-30
 165 series EMU car - No. KuMoHa 165-108 (built 1966 by Tokyu Car, from Mino-Ōta Depot)
 165 series EMU car - No. SaRo 165-106 (built 1967 by Imperial Car, from Hamamatsu Works)
 381 series EMU car - No. KuHa 381-1 (built 1973 by Kawasaki Heavy Industries, from Mino-Ōta Depot)

Diesel railcars
 Class KiHa 48000 railcar - No. KiHa 48036 (built 1956 by Tokyu Car, from Sakuma Rail Park)
 Class KiHa 82 DMU car - No. KiHa 82-73 (built 1965 by Nippon Sharyo, from Mino-Ōta Depot)
 KiHa 181 series DMU car - No. KiHa 181-1 (built 1968 by Fuji Heavy Industries, from Sakuma Rail Park)

Steam railcars
 Class HoJi 6005 steam railcar - No. HoJi 6014 (built 1913 by Kisha Seizo)

Passenger carriages
 SuNi 30 passenger carriage – No. SuNi 30 95 (built 1929 by Osaka Tekko, from Sakuma Rail Park)
 OYa 31 passenger carriage – No. OYa 31 12 (built 1937 by Nakata Sharyo, from Sakuma Rail Park)
 OHa 35 passenger carriage – No. OHa 35 206 (built 1941 by Nippon Sharyo, from Sakuma Rail Park)
 MaINe 40 sleeping carriage – No. MaINe 40 7 (built 1948 by Nippon Sharyo, from Sakuma Rail Park)
 43 series passenger carriage – No. SuHa 43 321 (built 1954 by Niigata Tekko)
 10 series sleeping carriage – No. ORoNe 10 27 (built 1960 by Hitachi, from Sakuma Rail Park)

Former exhibits
 300 Series Shinkansen car – No. 323-20 (ex-set J21, built 1993 by Nippon Sharyo, from Hamamatsu Works, removed in December 2013)
 381 series EMU car - No. KuRo 381-11 (built 1974 by Kawasaki Heavy Industries, from Mino-Ōta Depot, removed in June 2019)
 117 series EMU cars - MoHa 116-59 + KuHa 116-209 (they were displayed outside, removed in June 2019)

History
Construction work started in August 2009, with the first exhibits moved in from July 2010. The museum opened on 14 March 2011.

On 29 January 2012, a small ceremony was held to mark the one millionth visitor to the museum.

See also
 Kyoto Railway Museum (JR West museum in Kyoto)
 Railway Museum (Saitama) (JR East museum in Saitama Prefecture)

References

External links

 

Central Japan Railway Company
Museums in Nagoya
Railway museums in Japan
Museums established in 2011
2011 establishments in Japan